Kentucky Route 132 (KY 132) is a  long state highway in Kentucky that runs from Kentucky Route 120  northeast of Marion to Kentucky Route 56 in Sebree via Clay and Dixon.

Major intersections

References

0132
Kentucky Route 132
Kentucky Route 132